Abdollah Nasseri is an Iranian football defender who currently plays for Iranian football club Tractor S.C. in the Persian Gulf Pro League.

Club career

Foolad
Nasseri was a main player in Foolad Novin in 2014–15 Azadegan League. In summer 2015 he promoted to Foolad and signed contract until 2018. He made his debut for Foolad on December 18, 2015 against Gostaresh Foolad as a starter.

Club career statistics

References

External links
 Abdollah Nasseri  at IranLeague.ir
Abdollah Nasseri on instagram 

Abdollah Nasseri  at Soccerway   
Abdollah Nasseri  at PersianLeague.com   
Abdollah Nasseri  
Abdollah Nasseri 

Living people
1992 births
Iranian footballers
Foolad FC players
People from Ahvaz
Saipa F.C. players
Sanat Naft Abadan F.C. players
Association football fullbacks
Sportspeople from Khuzestan province